Morton Selten (6 January 1860 – 27 July 1939) was a British stage and film actor. He was occasionally credited as Morton Selton.

Biography 
At birth, Selten was given the name Morton Richard Stubbs and claimed as the son of Morton Stubbs, a lawyer who died in 1877. It is said that Selten was widely believed to be an illegitimate son of the then Prince of Wales (and future King Edward VII). However, there was no truth in the story; his parents had married on 9 December 1859, and he was born a month later, some time prior to the Prince's first sexual experiences in 1861

Selten began acting on the stage in 1878, mainly in America. In 1889, he played Clarence Vane in Mrs. Hargrove's Our Flat at the Lyceum Theatre and Captain Heartsease in Shenandoah, Bronson Howard's American Civil War epic. Selten would go on to play in some twenty-five Broadway productions over the following three decades. His film career began with his portrayal of the Marquis of Shelford in Branded (1920). His last film role was as the King of the Land of Legend in The Thief of Bagdad (1940); Selten died during its production.

Stage work

Our Flat (1889) - Clarence Vane
Shenandoah (1889-1890) - Captain Heartsease
Captain Lettarblair (1891) - Francis Merivale
Sheridan (1893) - Capt. Lord Lochinvar
The Victoria Cross (1894)
An Enemy to the King (1896) - De Berquin
Change Alley (1897) - Jack Spurway
The King's Musketeer (1899) - Louis XIII
The King's Musketeer (1899) (second run) - Louis XIII
The Song of the Sword (1899)
Her Majesty, the Girl Queen of Nordenmark (1900)
Unleavened Bread (1901)
Her Lord and Master (1902)
Hearts Aflame (1902)
Heidelberg (1902-1903)
The Taming of Helen (1903)
Man Proposes (1904)
Camille (1904)
Yvette (1904)
My Wife (1907)
The World and His Wife (1908-1909) - Captain Beaulieu
The Barber of New Orleans (1909)
Herod (1909) - Pheroras
Smith (1910) - Herbert Dallas-Baker, K.C.
The Runaway (1911)
The "Mind-the-Paint" Girl (1912-1913) - Lionel Roper
The Amazons (1913) - Rev. Roger Minchin
The Legend of Leonora (1914) - Sir Roderick Peripety
The Little Minister (1916)
A Kiss for Cinderella (1916-1917) - Mr. Bodie
Humpty Dumpty (1918)

Filmography

Branded (1920) - Marquis of Shelford
Somebody's Darling (1925)
The Shadow Between (1931) - Sir George Fielder
Service for Ladies (1932) - Mr. Robertson
Wedding Rehearsal (1932) - Major Harry Roxbury
Falling for You (1933) - Caldicott
The Love Wager (1933) - General Neville
The Diplomatic Lover (1934) - Sir Charles
Once in a New Moon (1935) - Lord Bravington
Ten Minute Alibi (1935) - Sir Miles Standish
Annie, Leave the Room! (1935) - Lord Spendlove
Moscow Nights (1935) - Gen. Kovrin
The Ghost Goes West (1935) - The Glourie
His Majesty and Company (1935) - King of Poldavia
Dark World (1935) - Colonel
Two's Company (1936) - Earl of Warke
In the Soup (1936) - Abernethy Ruppershaw
Juggernaut (1936) - Sir Charles Clifford
Fire Over England (1937) - Burleigh
Action for Slander (1937) - Judge Trotter
The Divorce of Lady X (1938) - Lord Steele
A Yank at Oxford (1938) - Cecil Davidson, Esq.
Shipyard Sally (1939) - Lord Alfred Randall
Young Man's Fancy (1939) - Mr. Fothergill
The Thief of Bagdad (1940) - The Old King (final film role)

See also
List of British actors

References

External links

1860 births
1939 deaths
English male film actors
English male stage actors
20th-century English male actors